The cinnamon screech owl (Megascops petersoni) is a species of owl in the family Strigidae. It is found in the Andes of Ecuador and Peru and possibly Colombia.

Taxonomy and systematics

The cinnamon screech owl was first described to science in 1986, one of several Megascops owls described at about that time. Its specific epithet honors Roger Tory Peterson, "the father of modern field guides". Its exact relationships to others of its genus are inexact, but it is thought to be most closely relate to the rufescent screech owl (M. ingens) and cloud-forest screech owl (M. marshalli). It is monotypic.

Description

Adults have has a warm brown facial disc with a blackish border and the rest of the face is buffy. They have dark brown eyes, a blue-gray bill, and medium-length "ear" tufts. Their upperparts are cinnamon brown with fine darker brown and buffy vermiculation. The wings and tail are cinnamon as well with brownish and blackis bars. The underparts are a rich cinnamon buff with some warm brown wavy marks on the throat and chest. No juvenile has been described.

Distribution and habitat

According to the International Ornithological Committee (IOC) and the Clements taxonomy, the cinnamon screech owl is only known to occur on the eastern slope of the Andes from southern Ecuador into northern Peru. However, the South American Classification Committee of the American Ornithological Society (AOS/SACC) also places it in Colombia. It may also occur further south in Peru.

Behavior

Feeding

The cinnamon screech owl is nocturnal, like most others of its genus. Almost nothing is known about its hunting practices or diet, though the latter includes large arthropods and probably small vertebrates.

Breeding

The cinnamon screech owl's breeding season, nest, and eggs have not been described. It is assumed to nest in tree cavities like others of its genus.

Vocalization

The cinnamon screech owl's primary (territorial) song is "a flat series of hoots" similar to but faster than that of the rufescent screech owl. Its aggressive song is described as "pu-pu-pu-pu-pu pu pu pu pu pu" that starts fast, abruptly slows, and rises in pitch.

Status

The IUCN has assessed the cinnamon screech owl as being of Least Concern. However, "As is true of all species that are restricted for humid forest, Cinnamon Screech-Owl is vulnerable to habitat loss, degradation, and forest fragmentation."

References

Further reading

cinnamon screech owl
Birds of the Colombian Andes
Birds of the Ecuadorian Andes
Birds of the Peruvian Andes
cinnamon screech owl
Taxonomy articles created by Polbot